This article provides a list of Czech film directors.

B
Jaroslav Balík
Jiří Barta
Jiří Brdečka
Zbyněk Brynych
Jan Budař
Vlasta Burian

C
Jiří Chlumský
Věra Chytilová
Radúz Činčera

D
Oldřich Daněk

F
Miloš Forman
Martin Frič

G
Saša Gedeon

H
Hugo Haas
Ondřej Havelka
Karel Hašler
Hermína Týrlová
Juraj Herz
Jan Hřebejk

I
Svatopluk Innemann

J
Juraj Jakubisko
Karel Janák
Vojtěch Jasný
Jaromil Jireš
Pavel Juráček

K
Antonín Kachlík
Karel Kachyňa
Ján Kadár
Jan Kačer
Ondřej Kepka
Elmar Klos
Pavel Koutecký
Jan Kratochvíl
Jiří Krejčík
Ester Krumbachová
Václav Krška
Jan Kříženecký

L
Karel Lamač
Oldřich Lipský

M
Josef Mach
Gustav Machatý
Václav Matějka
Jiří Menzel
Vladimír Merta
Vladimír Michálek
Zdeněk Miler
Vladimír Morávek
Josef František Munclinger
Antonín Máša
Josef Šváb-Malostranský

N
Alice Nellis
Jan Němec

P
Ivan Passer
Jan Pinkava
Karel Plicka
Zdeněk Podskalský
Břetislav Pojar
Marie Poledňáková
Jindřich Polák

R
Karel Reisz
Filip Renč
Josef Rovenský
Břetislav Rychlík
Ladislav Rychman
Ludvík Ráža
Čestmír Řanda

S
Jan Schmidt
Evald Schorm
Jiří Sequens
Bohdan Sláma
Ladislav Smoljak
Karel Smyczek
Jaroslav Soukup
Karel Steklý
Jiří Strach
Martin Suchánek
Jan Svěrák
Radim Špaček
Milan Šteindler
Jan Švankmajer

T
Jan Tománek
Jiří Trnka
Ondřej Trojan
Zdeněk Troška
Helena Třeštíková

V
Vladislav Vančura
Drahomíra Vihanová
František Vláčil
Tomáš Vorel
Václav Vorlíček
Otakar Vávra
Dana Vávrová

W
Jiří Weiss

Z
Petr Zelenka
Karel Zeman

 
Film directors
Czech